Buttafava railway station is a railway station in Italy. Located on the Monza–Molteno railway, it serves the municipality of Arcore in Lombardy as its secondary station. The train services are operated by Trenord.

Train services 
The station is served by the following service(s):

Milan Metropolitan services (S7) Milan - Molteno - Lecco

See also 
 Milan suburban railway network
 Arcore railway station

References 

Railway stations in Lombardy
Milan S Lines stations
Railway stations opened in 1911
1911 establishments in Italy
Railway stations in Italy opened in the 20th century